Nisti Stêrk (born 29 October 1977) is a Swedish-Kurdish actress and comedian.

Nisti Stêrk has been writing all her life, but does not want to call herself an author. She is first and foremost an actress and a comedian.

Stêrk has created the character Zeyno, a pedantic "laundrywoman", who she has played in Utbildningsradion, in the City Theatre of Stockholm (Stockholms Stadsteater) and in Maximteatern. She has also played in Elektras systrar, (director Michael Cocke) and in Suzanne Ostens Kabaret Underordning. She has been written chronicles in Stockholm City and Göteborgs-Posten. In 2006 she wrote the children's book Ramazan från Diyarbakir i Turkiet.

In August 2008 her book Så länge Gud vill och rumpan håller! got published. It is partly a biography and a celebration to dreams that can come true and an encouragement to the reader to not give up their dreams.

In 2009 Nisti Stêrk hosted a talkshow at the new kurdish TV channel TRT6 in Turkey. The Talk show was called Gulfiros and Nisti hosted it together with the Turkish pop star Berdan Mardini.

Theatre
 För Sverige i tiden (Maximteatern/Riksteatern) 2007/2008
 The good body (Riksteatern) 2006
 Zeynos värld (Stadsteatern/Maximteatern/Riksteatern) 2005/2006
 Kabaret Underordning (Stadsteatern) 2005
 China - En ugandisk barnsoldat (Stadsteatern) 2005
 Elektras systrar (Uppsala stadsteater/Stockholms stadsteater/Fryshuset) 2004
 Stockholm City serenad (Kulturhuvudstads årsproduktion) 1998

Film
 När mörkret faller 2006
 Wellkåmm to Verona 2005

TV
 Asien från ovan (svensk berättarröst) 2015
 Gulfiros, talkshow i Turkiet (TRT6) 2009
 Singing bee, (Kanal5) 2009
 Doobidoo, (svt) 2008
 Sing a long, (svt) 2007
 Allsång på Skansen (svt) 2006
 Leende guldbruna ögon (svt) 2006
 Lasermannen (svt) 2006
 Graven (svt) 2005
 Testa ditt val (svt) 2006
 Faktum (svt) 2005
 Svt Nöjespanel 2005
 TV 4 panel 2005
 Zeynos värld (Ur/Svt) 2004
 C/o Segemyhr 2004
 OP 7 (kanal 5) 2001

Radio
 Sommarvärd "Sommar" i P1 2006
 Du gamla du fria 2006
 Ingen vill veta var du köpt din slöja 2005
 Soppåse till himmelen 2004
 Tuff kurd i lyxförpackning 2004
 Dö i luften 2000

Scripts
 För Sverige i tiden 2007
 Du gamla du fria 2006
 Zeynos värld 2005
 Ingen vill veta var du köpt din slöja 2004

Books
 Så länge Gud vill och rumpan håller (Cordia) 2008
 Ramazan från Diyarbakir i Turkiet 2006

Chronicles
 Stockholm City
 Göteborgsposten
 Nummer
 Akt

Awards
2003 Årets ståuppare
2004 Fadime-priset
2006 Radiopriset
2006 Stallbrödernas Bosse Parnevik-stipendium
2006 Kommunala landstingets stipendium

References

External links
Nisti Stêrk's website

Living people
1977 births
Swedish actresses
Swedish comedians
Swedish television hosts
Swedish women television presenters
Sommar (radio program) hosts
Kurdish actresses
Kurdish comedians

Swedish people of Kurdish descent